Platydoris pulchra is a species of sea slug, a dorid nudibranch, shell-less marine opisthobranch gastropod mollusks in the family Discodorididae.

Distribution
This species was described from Wasin, Kenya. It is reported from Tanzania, Madagascar and Sri Lanka.

References

External links 
 

Discodorididae
Gastropods described in 1904